McCormick Hall is a historic building on the campus of Hastings College in Hastings, Nebraska, United States. It was built in 1883–1884, and designed in the Italianate architectural style. It was the first building on campus, and it housed the departments of English, Journalism, Speech, Drama, Mathematics and Chemistry. There was also a Presbyterian chapel on the second floor, later a theatre. It has been listed on the National Register of Historic Places since May 12, 1975.

References

	
National Register of Historic Places in Adams County, Nebraska
Italianate architecture in Nebraska
School buildings completed in 1883
Hastings College